The Hundred-Year-Old Man Who Climbed Out of the Window and Disappeared, also known as The 100 Year-Old Man Who Climbed Out the Window and Disappeared, is a 2013 internationally co-produced comedy film directed by Felix Herngren based on the 2009 novel of the same name by Jonas Jonasson. The film was screened in the Berlinale Special Gala section of the 64th Berlin International Film Festival.

The film was released in more than 40 countries and grossed more than US$50 million, making it the third highest grossing Swedish film of all time, only beaten by The Girl With the Dragon Tattoo (Män som hatar kvinnor) and The Girl Who Played with Fire (Flickan som lekte med elden).

The film was nominated for the Academy Award for Best Makeup and Hairstyling at the 88th Academy Awards. A sequel, titled The 101-Year-Old Man Who Skipped Out on the Bill and Disappeared, was released in 2016.

Plot
In 2005, Allan Karlsson (Robert Gustafsson) lives alone with his pet cat Molotov as his only company. When Molotov is killed by a fox, an enraged Allan gets revenge by blowing up the fox using dynamite, which prompts the authorities to move him to a retirement home in Malmköping. On the same day as his centenary celebration, Allan climbs out of the window and disappears, walking to the bus station intending on traveling as far as he can. While waiting for his bus, a young skinhead (Simon Säppenen) angrily demands Allan watch his suitcase whilst he uses the toilet. When the bus arrives, Allan leaves with the suitcase, and travels to the remote location of Byringe. By the time he leaves Malmkoping, his carers have informed the police of his disappearance, and Inspector Aronsson (Ralph Carlsson) is investigating, unaware of the suitcase in Allan's possession.

In Byringe, Allan is helped by recluse Julius Jonsson, who helps him fight off the pursuing gangsters to whom the suitcase belongs. While fleeing the scene, Allan and Julius catch a lift from Benny, an insecure young man, and all three find their way to a smallholding where Gunilla lives with her pet elephant, Sonja. The gangsters meet their individual deaths through misadventure, apart from Gäddan, their violent boss, who loses his memory after an accident and becomes part of the group.

Parts of the film co-exist with the main story as a series of flashbacks in Allan's life. In his childhood, Allan's father invents the condom, an invention that was seen by the Swedish monarchy as blasphemous. Enraged, Allan's father travels to Russia after the Russian Revolution to set up his own republic and support his invention, only to be executed by firing squad. While still young, Allan's sick mother eventually dies, but her final words to him are never to think or talk too much. In her words, she tells Allan that "That is what it is, and that it will be what it will be".

In his youth, Allan is sent to a mental hospital after accidentally blowing up a local butcher who swindled his mother. Upon being released as an adult, Allan finds work at a cannon foundry, where he befriends Esteban, a Spanish revolutionary. The talkative Esteban convinces Allan to go with him to Spain to fight the Nationalist regime under Francisco Franco. Esteban is immediately killed, reminding Allan of his mother's warnings about talking too much. Allan's expertise in explosives makes his job of blowing up bridges crucial to the Republican forces. However, moments before destroying a bridge, Allan's love of explosives suddenly palls and he decides to leave. General Franco's staff car approaches the bridge he was supposed to demolish, the explosion taking place seconds after Allan waves down the car, making Allan appear a hero. Franco invites Allan to a dinner, where he presents his favorite pistol to him for saving his life.

Years after the Civil War, Allan sells the pistol to buy a work permit to travel to America. When informed that the world's biggest bomb is being assembled, Allan's passion for explosives is re-ignited and he helps Robert Oppenheimer (Philip Rosch) in successfully developing the atomic bomb. For his work, Allan receives praise from U.S. Vice President Harry S. Truman (Kerry Shale) for 'building a bomb that will stop all wars'. During a drunken dinner, Truman is informed by telephone that Franklin D. Roosevelt, then President of the United States, has died, and Truman is immediately sworn in as president.

Allan returns to Sweden, but on touching down he is met by representatives of the Swedish government, seeking to make use of his knowledge of the atomic bomb. However, they are totally unconvinced that Allan, who never attended a university, could have any vital role in its development of the bomb and they abandon any attempt to interrogate him further. A man named Popov later befriends Allan, gets him drunk and leads him to Moscow. During a drunken party with Joseph Stalin, Allan accidentally admits that he saved Franco's life, causing the infuriated Stalin to imprison Allan in a Siberian Gulag labor camp.

The story continues through other countries and wild adventures, with Allan "coincidentally" meeting new people, both famous and ordinary, and causing world changing events, in a way that has been compared with Forrest Gump. The two storylines of Allan's life in the past, and his adventures since he climbed out of the window, eventually merge. The police call off the search for Allan, not realizing he has anything to do with the loss of the suitcase and money. With the help of Popov's son Oleg, Allan and his friends settle down to a life of leisure in Bali.

Cast
 Robert Gustafsson as Allan Karlsson
 Iwar Wiklander as Julius
 David Wiberg as Benny
 Mia Skäringer as Gunilla
 Jens Hultén as Gäddan
 Bianca Cruzeiro as Caracas
 Alan Ford as Pim
 Sven Lönn as Hinken
 David Shackleton as Herbert Einstein
 Georg Nikoloff as Popov
 Sibylle Bernardin as Amanda Einstein
Koldo Losada as Francisco Franco
 Kerry Shale as Harry S. Truman
Philip Rosch as Robert Oppenheimer
 Algirdas Paulavicius as Joseph Stalin
Sigitas Rackys as Mikhail Gorbachev
Keith Chanter as Ronald Reagan
Dagny Carlsson as elderly woman

Reception
The Hundred-Year-Old Man Who Climbed Out of the Window and Disappeared received a 68% approval rating on Rotten Tomatoes, based on 80 reviews, with an average rating of 6/10. The consensus reads: "Its efforts to earn laughs can be as ungainly as its title, but for viewers in tune with its absurdist humor, The 100-Year-Old Man Who Climbed Out the Window and Disappeared offers much to recommend." On Metacritic, the film has a score of 58 out of 100, based on 15 critics, indicating "mixed or average reviews".

References

External links
 
 
 
 

2013 films
2013 comedy films
Swedish comedy films
StudioCanal films
2010s Swedish-language films
2010s German-language films
2010s French-language films
2010s Spanish-language films
2010s Russian-language films
2010s English-language films
English-language Swedish films
Films based on Swedish novels
Films set in Sweden
Films set in Spain
Films set in Russia
Films about old age
Spanish Civil War films
Cultural depictions of Francisco Franco
Cultural depictions of Harry S. Truman
Cultural depictions of J. Robert Oppenheimer
Cultural depictions of Joseph Stalin
Cultural depictions of Mikhail Gorbachev
Cultural depictions of Ronald Reagan
2013 multilingual films
Swedish multilingual films
2010s Swedish films